Zuccagnia punctata is a species of flowering plant in the family Fabaceae. It belongs to the subfamily Caesalpinioideae.

Plants grow to about 5m tall, have small leaflets with clearly visible punctate glands, yellow 5-merous flowers, and produce leathery, red-haired dehiscent pods bearing a single seed each.

The genus was named in honor of Italian botanist and teacher Attilio Zuccagni (1754–1807), who was the Director of the The Natural History Museum of the University of Florence in Florence. The specific epithet punctata is Latin, meaning "spotty", and refers to the appearance of the leaf surface.

It was published in Icon. (Cavanilles) vol.5 on page 2 in 1799 by Antonio José Cavanilles.

References

Caesalpinieae
Monotypic Fabaceae genera
Flora of Argentina
Flora of Chile
Taxa named by Antonio José Cavanilles